The PNS Qasim (also known as Marines Base Qasim) is a major marines base that serves as the headquarter of the Pakistan Marines for their administrative, operational and logistic requirements. PNS Qasim, the garrison of Pakistan Marines, is served as the logistic base for the Marines which is responsible for general administration and naval/military logistics requirements. The Pakistan Marines Corps structure is composed of five segments, and the PNS Qasim is part of the Eastern Naval Command of Pakistan Navy. The base is named after the legendary Muslim Arab general Muhammad bin Qasim who conquered Daybul and the coastal areas of Sindh around 712 CE.

History

The Pakistan Marines were formed on June 1, 1971 to support the riverine and Amphibious operations in Pakistani province of East-Pakistan. It was headquartered in PNS Dhaka under the command of then 2 star Rear-Admiral Mohammad Shariff. In 1974, Marine Corps were disbanded from the services of Pakistan Armed Forces by President, later elected Prime minister Zulfikar Ali Bhutto as the Service branch had completely failed to achieve any minor or major objectives in both the 1971 Winter War and the Bangladesh Liberation War.

On April 14, 1990, the Marine Corps were recreated in the Pakistan's Pakistan Defence Forces, and is recognized as one of her seven uniformed services as of 2000. In 1990, Pakistan Navy decided to establish the first Marine Battalion at Qasim Fort which was at that time under the operational control of PNS Himalaya. On November 25, 1990, the PNS Qasim was given commissioned as the headquarters/logistic base of Pakistan Marines.  The Commissioning Crew consisted of eight senior flag rank officers, 67 Chief Petty Officers and Sailors from general Service and 43 Marines office r. The base oversaw and witnessed the Indo-Pakistani War of 1999, Atlantique Incident, 2002 Indo-Pakistani Standoff, War on Terror and Sir Creek Conflict.

Organisation

Marines Training Centre (MTC)

The Marines Training Centre (MTC) was established in 1990 to impart basic and advanced training for the Pakistan Marines (PM). During the 1990s, the Pakistan Army provided and trained the 1st Marine Offence Battalion as well as running the Training Centre. In 2000, the Pakistan Navy took control of the centre while the Army continued to train the Marines. In 2004, as Marines were given the status of one of the seven recognised uniformed services of the Pakistan Armed Forces, the PM took control of the Centre. As of today, there are large numbers of United States Marine Corps and Royal Marines personnel, as military advisors, providing training for the Marines.

Pakistan Naval Police

The MTC is also the headquarters of the Pakistan Navy Police (PNP), and conducts basic and refresher training for PNP personnel.

Creeks Battalion

The Creeks battalion was raised in April 1999 by the Pakistan Army with the objective to thwart external threat in creeks, through a forward presence and active surveillance in peacetime, as well as defending designated areas of responsibility during wartime. Sir Creek Battalion is commanded by an officer of Commander rank.

References

External links
 PNS Qasim

Qasim
Military installations in Karachi
Qasim